Hypsopygia jezoensis is a species of snout moth in the genus Hypsopygia. It was described by Shibuya in 1928. It is found in Taiwan and Japan.

The wingspan is 27 mm.

References

Moths described in 1928
Pyralini
Moths of Japan